Penz13.com is a German racing team outfit established in 2009 that competes in international road racing on courses as the Isle of Man TT, Macau Grand Prix, and the FIM Endurance World Championship. Its teams include the Penz13.com Franks Autowelt and  Penz13.com BMW Motorrad.

History 
The team was established in 2009 with rider Rico Penzkofer. The goal was to bring a brand new BMW S1000RR to Macau racing the Macau Motorcycle Grand Prix in 2009. Until this date the S1000RR was only represented in the World Superbike Series and yet released for road use. Penzkofer took 
fifth place on Macau’s Guia circuit.

During the following years the team continued to invest in its structure and equipment, competing on a professional level in the World Endurance Championship with additional starts at the world’s biggest road races – the Tourist Trophy at the Isle of Man, the International North West 200 and the Macau Grand Prix.

In 2012 they secured the World Endurance championship title in Stocksport class as well as the fourth overall in the Superbike class in 2015 and 2017.

International Road Racing 

Some of the most important results in recent years were surely the Team Championship and podium finish of Michael Rutter in the Macau Grand Prix 2015 as well as the Top 5 result at the Isle of Man with Gary Johnson in 2016 and the winning strike of Michael Rutter in Frohburg that same year. 
2017 was a key season with a line up of riders that included Michael Rutter, Dan Kneen, former Moto3 championship rider, Danny Webb, and World Superbike rider Alessandro Polita. The 2017 Superstock TT race saw the team’s first step on the podium with a further Top 5 finish in the SBK race of Manxman Kneen. 

In 2018 the team partnered with the Czech Corporation WEPOL and continued in the international road racing scene. Besides appearing in the International events such as the Isle of Man TT and Macau the team competed in the [[International Road Racing
Championship]] (IRRC) with a four rider line up while additionally contracting various wild card riders. It turned out to be the most successful season in team history. 
With Danny Webb taking the championship crown in the IRRC Superbike Class, French rider Matthieu Lagrive dominated the IRRC Supersport class. Czech rider Marek Cerveny (4th) and the British rider Jamie Coward (6th) completed the stellar performance of the team. Additionally Davey Todd, Daley Mathison, Dan Kruger, Derek Sheils and Martin Jessopp took various wildcards in Imatra Finland, Frohburg Germany and in Macau China.

The team won with Davey Todd again the IRRC Superbike championship with two races left in the calendar.

FIM Endurance World Championship 
The team debuted in the FIM Endurance World Championship in the FIM World Cup in 2010, securing the runner-up position in 2011 and then win in 2012. The Penz13 squad made the step-up to the Superbike Class in 2015 and has competed  in the following year including  pole position at the 24 Heures Motos in Le Mans in 2016.

After the two podium finishes in the 24h races during the 2017 - 2018 season the team decided to concentrate on the road
races and rebuild the team structure with a new manufacturer coming on board for the season 2018 – 2019. After ten years working with BMW and great success it was time to change things around and looking into new perspectives and opportunities.
With Yamaha the team partnered a Japanese manufacturer with a real racing DNA in its corporate policy – a needed move in order to strive for the world title in the near future.

Mounted with Yamaha R1 machinery the team continued in the Endurance World Championship. Just three weeks before the race  Bol d’Or in September 2018, the team received the new bikes. While switching manufacturers the team was also challenged in contracting new riders. With Danny Webb remaining in the team, it was South African Sheridan Morais, French EWC champion Matthieu Lagrive and lastly Ex-Moto GP rider Michael Laverty rounding up the new line up. The new season kicked off successfully with another podium finish in 3rd position finish as well as two 4th places whereas the team currently takes 3rd in the overall championship after three out of five rounds.

References 

Motorcycle racing teams